OpenDyslexic is a free typeface/font designed to mitigate some of the common reading errors caused by dyslexia. The typeface was created by Abelardo González, who released it through an open-source license. The design is based on DejaVu Sans, also an open-source font. 

Like many dyslexia-intervention typefaces, most notably Dyslexie, OpenDyslexic adds to dyslexia research and is a reading aid.  It is not a cure for dyslexia. The typeface includes regular, bold, italic, bold-italic, and monospaced font styles. The benefit has been questioned in scientific studies.

In 2012, González explained his motivation to the BBC: "I had seen similar fonts, but at the time they were completely unaffordable and so impractical as far as costs go."

Integration 
The typeface is currently an optional choice on many websites and formats, including Wikipedia, Instapaper, Kobo eReader, Amazon Kindle Paperwhite, a few children's books, and at least one imprint of classic literature.

There is also a Google Chrome extension available, which was developed by Abelardo González and Robert James Gabriel. It is also part of the "dyslexia-friendly mode" in Oswald Foundation's web accessibility products.

Scientific studies 
Two small studies have investigated the effect of specialized fonts used with students with dyslexia. Rello and Baeza-Yates (2013) measured eye-tracking recordings of Spanish readers (aged 11–50) with dyslexia and found that OpenDyslexic did not significantly improve reading time nor shorten eye fixation. In her master's thesis, Leeuw (2010) compared Arial and Dyslexie with 21 Dutch students with dyslexia and found OpenDyslexic did not lead to faster reading, but may help with some dyslexic-related errors. The British Dyslexia Association recommend “plain, evenly spaced sans serif font such as Arial and Comic Sans. Alternatives include Verdana, Tahoma, Century Gothic, Trebuchet”.

Related typefaces 
There are other typefaces and fonts that have been linked to benefits for people with dyslexia including: BBC Reith, Comic Sans, Dyslexie, FS Me, Sassoon and Sylexiad.

See also
Font
Irlen syndrome
Legibility
Readability
Type design

References

External links

Dyslexia
Sans-serif typefaces
Open-source typefaces